The Musée de Picardie is the main museum of Amiens and Picardy, in France. It is located at 48, rue de la République, Amiens. Its collections include artifacts ranging from prehistory to the 19th century, and form one of the largest regional museums in France. 

As an institution, the museum was founded as the Musée Napoléon in 1802 (the year of the Treaty of Amiens). However, the current building that houses the museum is more recent, being purpose-built as a regional museum between 1855 and 1867. The Second Empire style building was designed by architects Henri Parent and Arthur-Stanislas Diet. It was built thanks to the Société des Antiquaires de Picardie, keen to give the city somewhere to house the collections the society had gathered over decades. A prototype for other French regional museums, it was France's first building constructed exclusively for the purpose of conservation and exhibition of artworks.

Collections

Archaeology
Housed in the basement, archaeological collections include artifacts from:
ancient Greece
ancient Egypt, with around 400 objects (of which 257 are on show), mainly derived from the collection of the painter Albert Maignan and from national collections placed here
the archaeology of Picardy

Medieval
12th to 16th centuries, with the main pieces being the Puys d'Amiens, masterpieces of Gothic art from Amiens Cathedral.

Fine arts
French and foreign painters from 17th to 20th centuries, with artists such as:

 Francis Bacon
 François Boucher
 Jean Siméon Chardin
 Camille Corot
 Gustave Courbet
 Jacob Gerritsz Cuyp
 Philippe de Champaigne
 Jusepe de Ribera
 Jean-Honoré Fragonard
 Luca Giordano
 El Greco
 Francesco Guardi
 Frans Hals
 Eugène Lepoittevin
 Jacob Jordaens
 Joan Miró
 Francis Picabia
 Pablo Picasso
 Maurice Quentin de La Tour
 Alfred-Georges Regner, painter engraver
 Andrea Schiavone
 Hyacinthe Rigaud
 Hubert Robert
 Giambattista Tiepolo
 Rogier van der Weyden
 Jan van Goyen
 Alvise Vivarini
 Simon Vouet
 Édouard Vuillard

Pierre Puvis de Chavannes painted monumental frescoes on the museum's main staircase and first floor galleries, including the two large symbolic frescoes Peace and War (1861) and Work and Rest (1863).

An 1822 painting by Jérôme-Martin Langlois, Diana and Endymion, was displayed at the museum from 1878. It was believed to have destroyed in bombing in 1918 during World War I and was part of the Musée de Picardie's collection that had been evacuated to the Louvre for safekeeping. The painting was missing from the works that were returned to Amiens from the Louvre after the end of the war. It was initially described as "untraceable since the return of the 1918 removed works" and subsequently as "destroyed by the falling of a bomb on the museum". It may be in the private collection of the American performer Madonna.

Musée de l'Hôtel de Berny
Located near Amiens Cathedral, the Hôtel de Berny is an annexe of the Musée de Picardie.

Notes and references

Bibliography
  Matthieu Pinette, Couleurs d'Italie, couleurs du Nord - Peintures étrangères des musées d'Amiens, édition Somogy, Paris, 2001.

External links

  

Art museums and galleries in France
Archaeological museums in France
Buildings and structures in Amiens
Musee de Picardie
Egyptological collections in France
Local museums in France
Musee de Picardie
1802 establishments in France
Museums established in 1802